Yongqing is a county in Hebei province, China. It is under the administration of the prefecture-level city of Langfang.

History

Administrative divisions
The county administers 1 subdistrict, 5 towns and 5 townships.

The only subdistrict Yongqingxian Subdistrict

Towns:
Yongqing, Hancun, Houyi, Bieguzhuang, Lilancheng

Townships:
Caojiawu Township, Longhuzhuang Township, Liujie Township, Sanshengkou Township, Guanjiawu Hui Ethnic Township

Climate

Pagodas

Transportation

References

External links
Official Website of the Yongqing County government

 
County-level divisions of Hebei
Langfang